Teutopolis High School is a high school located in the village of Teutopolis, Illinois, in the United States.

Mascot: Wooden Shoe
Team Name: Wooden Shoes
Colors: Navy, Gold and White

External links
School website

Schools in Effingham County, Illinois
Public high schools in Illinois